Third Act Stories is the first EP by American rock band The Bigger Lights. It contains six tracks. According to bassist Dan Mineart, this was never an official release, but meant for promotional purpose while touring.

Track list

"I’ll Meet You At The Bottom" – 2:58
"When Did We Lose Ourselves" – 3:26
"Revved And Ready" – 3:05
"Romance In A Slow Dance" – 2:52
"The Chemicals Of You" – 3:25
"Thieves We Are" – 4:16

2007 EPs
The Bigger Lights albums